Paraphaeobacter is a Gram-negative and aerobic  genus of bacteria from the family of Rhodobacteraceae with one known species (Paraphaeobacter pallidus). Paraphaeobacter pallidus has been isolated from water from the Bohai Sea in China.

References

Rhodobacteraceae
Bacteria genera
Monotypic bacteria genera